Battle Picture Weekly, at various times also known as Battle Action, Battle Action Force, Battle and Battle with Storm Force, was a British war comic book magazine published by IPC Magazines from (issues dates) 8 March 1975 to 23 January 1988, when it merged with the new incarnation of Eagle. Most stories were set in World War II, with some based on other conflicts.

A notable feature of the comic, suited to its era of circulation, was its letters page with readers sending in stories of their fathers' and grandfathers' exploits during the First World War and the Second World War, often in an effort to win a nominal star letter prize. The comic at various times printed colour pinups of tanks, planes, ships, etc. in the centrefold or the back page (inner or outer).

Publication history
In 1974, in response to the success of the D. C. Thomson & Co. Ltd war comic Warlord, IPC hired freelance writers Pat Mills and John Wagner to develop a rival title. Mills and Wagner brought in fellow freelancer Gerry Finley-Day to help develop stories. Dave Hunt was made editor after eight issues. Doug Church also was very involved as a 'Creative Editor' on covers, layouts, features. When the title proved a success, Mills went on to create Action and 2000 AD, while Wagner was asked to revive Valiant. The attempts to breathe new life into Valiant were unsuccessful, and it was merged with Battle on 23 October 1976. For some time afterwards the merged comic was entitled Battle Picture Weekly and Valiant. Action also merged with Battle on 19 November 1977, the resulting comic being named Battle Action. In 1979, Terry Magee was appointed editor, while Dave Hunt later became editor of the new Eagle in 1982. Barrie Tomlinson was the Group Editor and Gil Page was the Managing Editor. The Director of the Youth Group was John Sanders. In 1982 the comic was retitled again, to Battle.
 Assistant Editor (for most of Battle comic's life): Jim Storrie
 Art Editors included Roy Stedall-Humphrys and Peter Downer
 Editorial assistants included Barrie Clements, Roy Preston, Ron Cooper, Richard Burton
 Art assistants: Tim Skomski, Martin Goldring

The details of title changes are:
 Battle Picture Weekly (8 March 1975 [issue #1] – 16 October 1976 [issue #85])
 Battle Picture Weekly and Valiant (23 October 1976 [issue #86] – 1 October 1977 [issue #135])
 Battle Picture Weekly (8 October 1977 [issue #136] – 11 November 1977 [issue #141])
 Battle-Action (19 November 1977 [issue #142] – 1 July 1978 [issue #175])
 Battle Action (8 July 1978 [issue #176] – 4 October 1980 [issue #283]) : indicia still reads Battle-Action
 Battle Action (11 October 1980 [issue #284] – 25 July 1981 [issue #325]) : indicia now reads Battle Action
 Battle (1 August 1981 [issue #326] – 1 October 1983 [issue #439])
 Battle Action Force (8 October 1983 [issue #440] – 29 November 1986 [issue #604])
 Battle (6 December 1986 [issue #605] – 17 January 1987 [issue #611])
 Battle Storm Force (24 January 1987 [issue #612] – 23 January 1988 [issue #664])

Tie-in with Action Force
From 1983 through to 1986, the comic ran a series of stories relating to the Palitoy range of action figures, Action Force. The Action Force characters initially guest-featured in a comic strip serial in Battle for four weeks in July 1983. The strip proved to be so popular that a further five promotional mini-comics were included free with every IPC publication in the weeks to follow. On 8 October 1983, Action Force joined the pages of Battle full-time and the comic was retitled Battle Action Force.

Eventually, in line with the increasing popularity of the toys, the focus of the comic moved towards Action Force (at the expense of some of the longer-running and more traditional wartime stories) and providing the back-stories to the action figures in circulation at the time.

During 1984 to 1985, Palitoy increasingly used the comic as a promotional publication, running competitions, mail-in offers and fan-club elements of the Action Force toy range through its pages. As Action Force itself transmuted to its G.I. Joe equivalent (Action Force – Third generation), the comic took on the role of providing continuity with regard to the diverging storylines and characters. By the end of 1986, Palitoy had lost the Action Force licence to Marvel UK and the comic was again re-titled first as Battle (1986) and then Battle with Storm Force (1987) prior to its eventual merger with Eagle (1988).

Notable stories
Notable stories included:
 The Bootneck Boy, written by Ian MacDonald and later by Wagner and illustrated by Joan Giralt Banus — about Danny Budd, a young orphan who, having been reluctantly raised by his unpleasant uncle, enlists in the Royal Marines where he is picked on because of his small physique but he remains determined to prove himself.
 Charley's War, by Pat Mills and Joe Colquhoun — this series told the story of 16-year-old Charley Bourne who enlists in the British army during the First World War. He serves in the trenches on the Western Front 1916–1918 and later in the Russian Civil War in 1919. The series was continued for a short period into the Second World War under a new writer, Scott Goodall but the series was then ceased due to the ill health of artist Joe Colquhoun.
 The Commando They Didn't Want by Terence Magee (written under the pseudonym John Richard) and Carlos Pino.
 Cooley's Gun by Gerry Finley-Day and Geoff Campion.
 D-Day Dawson, written by Finley-Day & Ron Carpenter and illustrated by Geoff Campion and Colin Page — about a British army Sergeant who is wounded on the D-Day beaches by a bullet that is lodged near his heart, sealing his eventual doom. However, the doctor that diagnoses the injury is then killed and Dawson rejoins his unit, no one else aware of his terminal condition, having decided to fight with his platoon until the end.
 Darkie's Mob, by Wagner and Mike Western — a violent series set in the jungles of Burma, with the renegade Captain Joe Darkie leading a group of lost soldiers in a personal guerrilla war against the Japanese.
 Death Squad by Alan Hebden and Eric Bradbury — a motley band of German soldiers serving in a penal battalion on the Eastern Front.
 El Mestizo, by Hebden and Ezquerra — about a former slave turned mercenary in the American Civil War.
 Fighter from the Sky by Gerry Finley-Day & Geoff Campion — in 1939 a German Paratrooper Paul Fallman is demoted back to private after his father is executed for treason, leaving his son determined to restore honour to his family name.
 Fighting Mann by Alan Hebden and Cam Kennedy — a veteran US Marine Colonel embarks on an un-authorized mission in the Vietnam War to locate his son, a Navy pilot, who has gone missing and has been accused of desertion. 
 The Fists of Jimmy Chang — Hong Kong martial arts expert Jimmy Chang battles organised crime and Communist agents using his kung fu skills (inspired by film star Bruce Lee).
 The Flight of the Golden Hinde by S. Conforth — another strip that featured in the debut issue of Battle. This story featured a replica of Sir Francis Drake's Golden Hind that sets sail in 1937 aiming to circumnavigate the world to commemorate the 450th anniversary of Drake's 1577 voyage. The ship is still at sea when the war breaks out in 1939. The Captain, James Finch, disobeys an order to return to Britain and instead decides to complete the voyage.
 Gaunt – set in World War II, about an unbalanced "hard man" given a superhumanly strong artificial hand to replace one lost during torture.
 The General Dies at Dawn, by Gerry Finley-Day and John Cooper — a Wehrmacht General, due to be executed for treason, spends his final hours describing his wartime experiences to the sympathetic guard outside his cell.
 Hellman of Hammer Force, written by Finley-Day — starring a German tank commander who fights throughout the Second World War from the invasion of Poland in 1939 to the fall of Berlin in 1945. The strip originally appeared in Action but it transferred to Battle when the two merged in 1977. This series was an intermittent one, drawn by several different artists, but the artist most associated with the series is Mike Dorey. 
 HMS Nightshade, by Wagner and Western — about the crew of a British Royal Navy Corvette at the height of the Battle of the Atlantic, protecting Allied supply convoys against the German U-Boats. 
 Hold Hill 109, written by Steve MacManus and drawn by Jim Watson — a mini-series set in North Africa about a ragged group of 13 Eighth Army soldiers who have six days to hold a vital hill against a vastly superior force of Afrika Korps.
 The Hunters by Terence Magee and Carlos Pino and later by Geoff Campion — a pair of secret agents, Ned Hare and Larry Fox, battle threats to national security whilst maintaining their cover as actors in a TV show where they also play secret agents (inspired by popular contemporary TV series The Professionals).
 Invasion 1984 by John Wagner and Eric Bradbury — when a race of skeletal-like aliens invade the world and enslave humanity British special forces unit 'Storm Squad' lead the fightback.
 Invasion! by Terence Magee and Jim Watson — a young boy finds himself caught up in the 1982 Falklands War.
 Jetblade — the adventures of an advanced prototype jet engine assisted helicopter as the crew perform demonstration missions for prospective buyers worldwide (inspired by contemporary TV series 'Airwolf'). 
 Joe Two Beans by John Wagner and Eric Bradbury — a Blackfoot Native American serves in the US Marine Corps in the Pacific War.
 Johnny Red, written by Tom Tully and drawn initially by Joe Colquhoun, later by John Cooper and finally by Carlos Pino — about a British fighter pilot Johnny "Red" Redburn flying for the Russians in a Hawker Hurricane fighter. Later Redburn flies with the RAF and United States Army Air Forces in England, before returning to the Eastern Front in a Hawker Typhoon nicknamed The Red Death. Johnny Red ran continuously for ten years and was Battle's longest-running series.
 Kommando King by Gerry Finley-Day and Geoff Campion
 Lofty's One-Man Luftwaffe, by Pat Mills, Wagner and Charlie Herring and drawn by Paolo Ongaro — about a British pilot, Dave 'Lofty' Banks, who speaks fluent German and is shot down over Occupied Europe in 1943. He escapes from a POW camp and to evade re-capture, he assumes the identity of a dead German pilot and ends up serving in the Luftwaffe. This series ran for 18 weeks and featured in the debut issue of Battle. 
 Major Eazy, by Alan Hebden and Ezquerra — a laid back, cigar-smoking British officer who drove a Bentley, visually based on James Coburn. For a time Major Eazy became the commander of Rat Pack.
 The Nightmare by Terence Magee and Mario Capaldi and later Carlos Pino — boy of the Blitz pursued by Nazi assassin.
 One-Eyed Jack by John Wagner and John Cooper — a Dirty Harry like character. Originally a cop in Valiant, he became a spy when he came to Battle.
 Panzer G-Man – by Gerry Finley-Day & Geoff Campion — a Panzer-Grenadier Kurt Slinger fights not only against the Allies but against deadly rivals among his own comrades. 
 Rat Pack — written by Gerry Finley-Day and initially drawn by Spanish artist Carlos Ezquerra — about a group of convicts released from prison to carry out suicide missions, inspired by The Dirty Dozen.
 Sailor Small by Scott Goodall and Phil Gascoigne.
 The Sarge by Gerry Finley-Day/Scott Goodall and drawn by Mike Western/Phil Gascoigne — British Sergeant Jim Masters, a veteran of WW1, has to shepherd his rookie, over-confident platoon during the Second World War.
 The Spinball Wars, written by Tom Tully, the story of a team involved in a violent futuristic sport, inspired by popular contemporary film Rollerball.
 Storm Force – a non-stop action strip about a squad of elite anti-terrorist warriors, inspired by Action Force.
 The Team That Went to War by Tom Tully with art by Mike Western and Jim Watson.
 Terror Behind the Bamboo Curtain by Charles Herring, Mills and Wagner (the latter two writers uncredited) and drawn by Giancarlo Alessandrini — British troops in a Japanese POW camp in Burma which is run by a sadistic commander who performs cruel punishments and experiments on his prisoners. This strip featured in Battle's debut issue.
 War Dog by Alan Hebden and Mike Western and later Cam Kennedy — a lost German Shepherd experiences World War II from different sides.
 The Wilde Bunch written by Scott Goodall
 Yellow Jack by Terence Magee — cowardly British soldier Jack Loot hungers for gold in the North African desert war.

Legacy
Garth Ennis has stated that Battle was "one of my favourites as a kid and a big influence on my own work. I used to enjoy Darkie's Mob, Crazy Keller, Hellman, Cooley's Gun, the later Rat Pack stories, Death Squad, The Sarge... the list is endless" and he wrote a letter to the comic pointing out an error in tank identification.

In November 2015, the character of Johnny Red was revived by writer Garth Ennis and illustrator Keith Burns for a new 8-part mini-series Johnny Red: Hurricane published by Titan Comics.

In August 2018, Rebellion issued a new 3-part comic series Sniper Elite: Resistance by Keith Richardson and Patrick Goddard, a spin-off from the PS-4 game Sniper Elite. The story, set in German-occupied France in 1941, included an appearance by the Rat Pack, original characters from Battle Picture Weekly.

In September 2020, Rebellion released a 100-page special issue of Battle under its Treasury of British Comics imprint. Entitled Battle of Britain Special, it featured ten new stories by various writers and artists. Several characters from past issues of Battle were revived including El Mestizo, written by Alan Hebden and a Rat Pack story by Garth Ennis. Other stories featured new characters and settings including War Child by Dan Abnett, a story produced in association with the charity War Child.

In June 2022 Rebellion published a hardcover Battle Action Special with new stories featuring characters from both comics, written by Garth Ennis and with various artists.

Collected editions
Some of the stories were collected into trade paperbacks by Titan Books:
 The Best of Battle: Volume 1 (288 pages, June 2009)
 The Best of Land Battle – This edition was originally planned to be released in 2010 but was postponed and has yet to be published.

Charley's War has been reprinted in a collection of hardcover volumes by Titan. Then in 2010, they began making more hardcover collections available including:

 Rat Pack: Guns, Guts & Glory (Volume 1) (128 pages, September 2010)
 Major Eazy: Heart of Iron (Volume 1) (120 pages, November 2010)
 Johnny Red: Falcons' First Flight (128 pages, November 2010)
 Darkie's Mob: The Secret War of Joe Darkie (112 pages, April 2011)
 Johnny Red Volume 2: Red Devil Rising (96 pages, June 2012)
 Johnny Red Volume 3: Angels over Stalingrad (104 pages, February 2013)
 Garth Ennis Presents: Battle Classics (255 pages, January 2014)- Features the entire series of HMS Nightshade and The General Dies at Dawn.
 Garth Ennis Presents: Battle Classics-Volume 2 (240 pages, August 2016)- Features the entire series of Fighting Mann and War Dog.
 Johnny Red Volume 4: The Flying Gun (160 pages, September 2016)

From 1 April 2009, Egmont UK in conjunction with W H Smith announced 4 special reprint collections from their stable, including a collection of Battle strips.

In 2018, Rebellion publishers began a new imprint called Treasury of British Comics, which featured reprinted collections of strips from various past British comics. So far, seven titles featuring stories from Battle Picture Weekly have been released:

Lofty's One-Man Luftwaffe (June 2018, a reprint of the complete series issued as a bonus extra with Judge Dredd Magazine #397)
El Mestizo (64 pages, November 2018)
Invasion 1984! (128 pages, May 2019)
Major Eazy vs Rat Pack (48 pages, October 2020)- reprint of 1977 Battle cross-over feature.
Death Squad (128 pages, November 2020)
Major Eazy Volume One: The Italian Campaign (128 pages, March 2021)
The Sarge: Volume One (144 pages, May 2022)

See also
 British comics

References

External links
 
 
 
 
 
 
 
 
 Best Of Battle
 Battle Action Force comic scans
 Battle Picture Weekly at Comics UK
 Charley's War fansite
 First part of an interview with John Wagner by David Bishop

1975 comics debuts
1988 comics endings
Comics magazines published in the United Kingdom
Weekly magazines published in the United Kingdom
Comics by John Wagner
Comics by Pat Mills
Defunct British comics
Magazines disestablished in 1988
Magazines established in 1975
Comics set during World War I
Comics set during World War II